New Visions Academy is a chain of charter schools in Payson and St. Johns, Arizona.

History
It was founded in 1997 as VisionQuest Academy; it changed names in April 1999. It had been sponsored by the Snowflake Unified School District until the summer of 2000. Its St. Johns campus opened in 2001; also that year, it ceased to serve grades 5 through 8 at its schools. The Star Valley/Payson campus opened in 2002 under the name Clearview Schools; it closed 2003 and was transferred in 2004. A former Springerville campus was closed in 2002 due to low enrollment.

References
Arizona Department of Education records

Public high schools in Arizona
Charter schools in Arizona
Schools in Apache County, Arizona
Schools in Gila County, Arizona